Set the Record Straight may refer to:

 Set the Record Straight (Fast Crew album)
 Set the Record Straight (Billy Ray Cyrus album)
 Set the Record Straight (song), by Tee Grizzley